Repyevka is a rural locality (a village) in Ibragimovsky Selsoviet, Chishminsky District, Bashkortostan, Russia. The population was 21 as of 2010. There is 1 street.

Geography 
Repyevka is located 37 km southeast of Chishmy (the district's administrative centre) by road. Pervomaysky is the nearest rural locality.

References 

Rural localities in Chishminsky District